Joseph Morris (October 16, 1795 – October 23, 1854) was an American politician who served as a U.S. Representative from Ohio from 1843 1847.

He was the father of James Remley Morris, who served in the U.S. Congress during the Civil War.

Early life and career 
Born in Greene County, Pennsylvania, Morris attended the public schools. He was sheriff of Greene County in 1824.
He moved to Woodsfield, Ohio, in 1829 and engaged in mercantile pursuits.
He served as a member of the State house of representatives in 1833 and 1834.

Congress 
Morris was elected as a Democrat to the Twenty-eighth and Twenty-ninth Congresses (March 4, 1843 – March 3, 1847) from Ohio's 15th Congressional district. He was not a candidate for renomination in 1846.

Retirement and death 
After retiring from the United States Congress he resumed business interests and then died in Woodsfield, Ohio on October 23, 1854. Morris was buried in Morris Cemetery, near Woodsfield.

Sources

1795 births
1854 deaths
People from Greene County, Pennsylvania
People from Woodsfield, Ohio
Democratic Party members of the Ohio House of Representatives
Pennsylvania sheriffs
19th-century American politicians
Democratic Party members of the United States House of Representatives from Ohio